Hydrillodes surata is a species of moth of the family Erebidae. It is found in New Zealand at the Kermadec Islands, New Hebrides, Samoa, Tonga.

References

Moths described in 1910
Herminiinae
Taxa named by Edward Meyrick
Moths of New Zealand
Fauna of the Kermadec Islands